Tasman Higgins (8 April 1888 – 4 June 1953) was an Australian cinematographer during the early days of the Australian film industry, working for such directors as Charles Chauvel, Raymond Longford, Beaumont Smith, Louise Lovely and Rupert Kathner. He was the brother of Arthur and Ernest Higgins, with whom he occasionally collaborated.

His most notable association was with Charles Chauvel, starting with In the Wake of the Bounty (1933), which was Errol Flynn's first film and involved three months of location filming on Pitcairn Island. Other credits include Heritage (1935), Uncivilised (1936) and the cavalry scenes of Forty Thousand Horsemen (1940).

Select filmography
The Tide of Death (1912)
Australia Calls (1913)
The Silence of Dean Maitland (1914)
A Coo-ee from Home (1918)
The Hordern Mystery (1920)
The Life Story of John Lee, or The Man They Could Not Hang (1920)
When the Kellys Were Out (1922)
Daughter of the East (1924)
Jewelled Nights (1925)
Environment (1927)
The Rushing Tide (1927)
Caught in the Net (1928)
Odds On (1928)
Fellers (1930)
The Hayseeds (1933)
In the Wake of the Bounty (1933)
When the Kellys Rode (1934)
Heritage (1935)
Uncivilised (1936)
The Avenger (1937)
Below the Surface (1938)
Forty Thousand Horsemen (1940)
Racing Luck (1941)

References

External links
 
 Tasman Higgins at National Film and Sound Archive
Tasman Higgins at Australian Dictionary of Biography
Abridged copy (5 minutes of more "risqué" shots removed) of In the Wake of the Bounty for download at Internet Archive

Australian cinematographers
1888 births
1953 deaths
People from Hobart